Kamal Benslama is a Moroccan-Swiss Experimental Particle Physicist. He is a Research Professor and a Senior Lecturer at Towson University . He worked on the ATLAS experiment, at the Large Hadron Collider (LHC) at CERN in Switzerland, which is considered as the largest experiment in the history of physical science.

Biography 

Originally from Morocco, Kamal Benslama studied physics at Geneva University. He obtained a bachelor and a Master in High Energy Physics from Geneva University. In 1993, he started a PhD at the department of High Energy Physics at the University of Lausanne (this department is now part of the EPFL since 2003) and obtained his PhD from the same university in 1998.

In 1999, Benslama moved to North America. He worked as a post-doc on the CLEO experiment at Cornell University in the US, then he became a research scientist at Columbia University in New York and associate scientist on the ATLAS experiment at Large Hadron Collider (LHC) at CERN. from 2006 to 2012, he was a Professor of Physics at the University of Regina in Canada. During this time, Benslama founded and led  an international research group in experimental high energy physics. He worked on the ATLAS experiment at CERN where he was a principal investigator and a team leader. He also was a member of the international ATLAS collaboration board and a member of the Liquid Argon representative board.

Benslama started his research activities at CERN in 1992, he first worked on ATLAS, then on NOMAD, (Neutrino Oscillation search with a MAgnetic Detector) which was designed to search for neutrino oscillation. His thesis was on the construction, installation and simulation of a preshower particle detector as well as on data analysis using data from the NOMAD experiment.

He contributed to many aspects of the ATLAS experiment. He worked on a readout system for a silicon detector for the ATLAS experiment, then he worked on the Liquid Argon Calorimeter, the High Level Trigger and Data Quality and Monitoring. He also led several efforts on searches for physics beyond the standard model at the LHC, in particular searches for doubly charged higgs, extra-dimensions and leptoquarks. He was heavily involved in the exotics physics program at the LHC.

Private life 
Kamal Benslama is married and lives with his wife Mandy and their three children  in Maryland.

Selected work 

 Observation of a new particle in the search for the Standard Model Higgs boson with the ATLAS detector at the LHC
 Prospects for the search for a doubly charged Higgs in the left–right symmetric model with ATLAS - G. Azuelos, K. Benslama, J. Ferland, 10 March 2005, J.Phys.G32:73-92,2006
 Exploring Little Higgs Models with ATLAS at the LHC - Azuelos, G; Benslama, K. Benslama et al - Eur. Phys. J., C 39 (2005) 13-24
 Design and implementation of the Front End Board for the readout of the ATLAS liquid argon calorimeters - N.~J.~Buchanan et al - JINST 3, P03004 (2008)
 Search for pair production of first or second generation leptoquarks in proton-proton collisions at √s=7  TeV using the ATLAS detector at the LHC
 Measurement of the top quark-pair production cross section with ATLAS in pp collisions at sqrt(s)=7 TeV 
 Measurement of the W → ℓν and Z/γ* → ℓℓ production cross sections in proton-proton collisions at sqrt(s)=7TeV with the ATLAS detector
 Electron reconstruction and identification efficiency measurements with the ATLAS detector using the 2011 LHC proton–proton collision data
 Measurements of charmless hadronic two-body B meson decays and the ratio B(B to DK)/B(B to DPi)
 Liste de publications et citations

References

External links  
 The ATLAS Experiment
 Large Hadron Collider at CERN

20th-century births
20th-century Swiss physicists
21st-century Swiss physicists
Moroccan scientists
Particle physicists
Living people
Experimental physicists
University of Lausanne alumni
Year of birth missing (living people)
University of Geneva alumni
People associated with CERN
Swiss people of Moroccan descent
Swiss expatriates in the United States
Cornell University staff
Columbia University staff
Academic staff of the University of Regina
Loyola University Maryland faculty
Towson University faculty
University System of Maryland faculty